ISO/IEC 14443 Identification cards -- Contactless integrated circuit cards -- Proximity cards is an international standard that defines proximity cards used for identification, and the transmission protocols for communicating with it.

Standard
The standard is developed by ISO/IEC JTC 1 (Joint Technical Committee 1) / SC 17 (Subcommittee 17) / WG 8 (Working Group 8).

Parts 

 ISO/IEC 14443-1:2018 Part 1: Physical characteristics
 ISO/IEC 14443-2:2016 Part 2: Radio frequency power and signal interface
 ISO/IEC 14443-3:2018 Part 3: Initialization and anticollision
 ISO/IEC 14443-4:2018 Part 4: Transmission protocol

Types 

Cards may be Type A and Type B, both of which communicate via radio at 13.56 MHz (RFID HF). The main differences between these types concern modulation methods, coding schemes (Part 2) and protocol initialization procedures (Part 3). Both Type A and Type B cards use the same transmission protocol (described in Part 4). The transmission protocol specifies data block exchange and related mechanisms:
data block chaining 
waiting time extension
multi-activation

ISO/IEC 14443 uses following terms for components:
 PCD: proximity coupling device (the card reader)
 PICC: proximity integrated circuit card

Physical size 
Part 1 of the standard specifies that the card shall be compliant with ISO/IEC 7810 or ISO/IEC 15457-1, or "an object of any other dimension".

Notable implementations
Ventra cards used in bus and trains
MIFARE cards (partial or full implementation, depending on product)
Biometric passports
EMV payment cards (PayPass, Visa payWave, ExpressPay)
National identity cards in the European Economic Area
Near Field Communication is based on in part, and is compatible with, ISO/IEC 14443
Calypso, open security standard for transit fare collection systems
CIPURSE, open security standard for transit fare collection systems

See also
ISO/IEC 7816, "with contact" smart card standard

List of ISO standards
FeliCa

References

External links 
Draft ISO/IEC 14443 standards
Requirements of ISO/IEC 14443 Type B Proximity Contactless Identification Cards, Application Note, Rev. 2056B–RFID–11/05, Atmel Corporation, 

Contactless smart cards
14443